Jeffris is an unincorporated community located in the town of Harrison, Lincoln County, Wisconsin, United States.

History
A post office called Jeffris was established in 1891, and remained in operation until it was discontinued in 1930. The community was named for James K. Jeffris.

Notes

Unincorporated communities in Lincoln County, Wisconsin
Unincorporated communities in Wisconsin